Pa Omar Jobe (born 26 December 1998) is a Gambian professional footballer who plays as a forward for FC Neman Grodno and has two caps for the Gambia national team.

Club career

Sheikh Jamal Dhanmondi
On 27 January 2021, Omar scored the first hattrick of 2021 Bangladesh Premier League, scoring four goals against Arambagh.

KF Shkendija

After a successful couple of seasons in Bangladesh, Jobe signed for Macedonian side KF Shkendija on a free transfer but failed to break into the first team and was promptly loaned out to fellow Macedonian side FC Struga for the remainder of the season.

References

1998 births
Living people
Association football forwards
Gambian footballers
The Gambia international footballers
Gambian expatriate footballers
Expatriate footballers in North Macedonia
Expatriate footballers in Belarus
Real de Banjul FC players
ASEC Ndiambour players
Sheikh Jamal Dhanmondi Club players
KF Shkëndija players
FC Struga players
FC Neman Grodno players